This is a list of islands of Scotland, the mainland of which is part of the island of Great Britain. Also included are various other related tables and lists. The definition of an offshore island used in this list is "land that is surrounded by seawater on a daily basis, but not necessarily at all stages of the tide, excluding human devices such as bridges and causeways".

Scotland has over 790 offshore islands, most of which are to be found in four main groups: Shetland, Orkney, and the Hebrides, sub-divided into the Inner Hebrides and Outer Hebrides. There are also clusters of islands in the Firth of Clyde, Firth of Forth, and Solway Firth, and numerous small islands within the many bodies of fresh water in Scotland including Loch Lomond and Loch Maree. The largest island is Lewis and Harris which extends to 2,179 square kilometres, and there are a further 200 islands which are greater than 40 hectares in area. Of the remainder, several such as Staffa and the Flannan Isles are well known despite their small size. Some 94 Scottish islands are permanently inhabited, of which 89 are offshore islands. Between 2001 and 2011 Scottish island populations as a whole grew by 4% to 103,702.

The geology and geomorphology of the islands is varied. Some, such as Skye and Mull, are mountainous, while others like Tiree and Sanday are relatively low lying. Many have bedrock made from ancient Archaean Lewisian Gneiss which was formed 3 billion years ago; Shapinsay and other Orkney islands are formed from Old Red Sandstone, which is 400 million years old; and others such as Rùm from more recent Tertiary volcanoes. Many of the islands are swept by strong tides, and the Corryvreckan tide race between Scarba and Jura is one of the largest whirlpools in the world. Other strong tides are to be found in the Pentland Firth between mainland Scotland and Orkney, and another example is the "Grey Dog" between Scarba and Lunga.

The culture of the islands has been affected by the successive influences of Celtic, Norse and English speaking peoples and this is reflected in names given to the islands. Many of the Hebrides have names with Scots Gaelic derivations, whilst those of the Northern Isles tend to be derived from the Viking names. A few have Brythonic, Scots and even perhaps pre-Celtic roots.
A feature of modern island life is the low crime rate and they are considered to be amongst the safest places to live in Britain. Orkney was rated as the best place to live in Scotland in both 2013 and 2014 according to the Halifax Quality of Life survey.

Rockall is a small rocky islet in the North Atlantic which was declared part of Scotland by the Island of Rockall Act 1972. However, despite no possession by any other state and other precedents, the legality of the claim is disputed by the Republic of Ireland, Denmark and Iceland and some say, it may be unenforceable in international law.

Demographics

The 2011 census records 94 Scottish islands as having a usually resident population of which 89 are offshore islands. There are however various complications with both the definitions of an "island" and occasional habitation and the National Records of Scotland also list a further 17 islands that were inhabited in 2001 but not 2011, or are "included in the NRS statistical geography for inhabited islands but had no usual residents at the time of either the 2001 or 2011 censuses". There are a small number of other islands that are evidently inhabited but which are not recorded in this list.

The local government council areas with the most inhabited islands are Argyll and Bute with 23, Orkney with 20, Shetland with 16 and Highland and Comhairle nan Eilean Siar with 14 each. There are also  three in North Ayrshire and one each in Fife, Perth and Kinross, Stirling and West Dunbartonshire. The last three named plus two islands in Argyll and Bute are freshwater rather than offshore.

In the past many smaller islands that are  uninhabited today had permanent populations. Losses were severe in many areas during the 19th century when islands such as Pabbay and Fuaigh Mòr were subject to forcible evictions during the Highland Clearances. Mass emigration from the Hebridean islands was at its height in the mid-19th century but it commenced as early as the 1770s in some areas. The crofting counties held 20% of Scotland's population in 1755 but by 1961 this figure had declined to 5%. Other examples include Mingulay, Noss and the St Kilda archipelago, which were abandoned during the course of the 20th century. Declines have been particularly significant in the more remote outlying islands, some of which remain vulnerable to ongoing losses.

The following table shows population trends for the ten most populous islands as of the last census. The overall trends are typically growth in populations in the early part of the modern period, followed by declines from the mid 19th century onwards. In every case except Orkney the highest population was recorded prior to 1932 and the lowest post-industrial revolution figure after 1960. Subsequently, there has been modest growth overall, although some islands are continuing to show a decline. Between 1991 and 2001, the population of the islands as a whole fell by 3% to 99,739, although there were 35 islands whose population increased. By contrast, between 2001 and 2011 Scottish island populations as a whole grew by 4% to 103,702. The Scottish Community Alliance noted that "the largest rate of increase has been in the Western Isles (6%) where local people now own approximately 60% of the landmass. Where populations have fallen (Bute, Arran and Islay) community ownership is virtually non-existent."

Largest Scottish islands by population

The following table compares the populations of the main Scottish archipelagos with that of the Faroe Islands for a similar time frame to the above.

Legislation
In July 2013, the Scottish Government made the Lerwick Declaration, indicating an intention to decentralise power to the three island council areas of Orkney, Shetland and the Western Isles and later that year made a commitment to do so. In 2017 an Islands bill was introduced to make "island proofing" (including for uninhabited islands) a statutory requirement for public bodies. The Bill completed Stage 1 on 8 February 2018.

Larger islands
This is a list of Scottish islands that either have an area greater than 40 hectares (approximately 100 acres) and/or are inhabited. The main groups, from Haswell-Smith (2004), in many cases provide a more useful guide to location than local authority areas. These groups are: Firth of Clyde, Islay, Firth of Lorn, Mull, Small Isles, Skye, Lewis and Harris, Uists and Barra, St Kilda, Orkney, Shetland and Firth of Forth. In a few cases where the island is part of either a recognisable smaller group or an archipelago, or is located away from the main groups, an archipelago, local authority or other descriptive name is used instead. "F" designates a freshwater island.

Scotland's islands include thirteen Munros (mountains with a height over 3,000 feet or 914.4 metres), twelve of them found on Skye, and a total of 227 Marilyns (hills with a relative height of at least 150 metres, regardless of absolute height).

These following are listed by the National Records of Scotland as "included in the NRS statistical geography for inhabited islands but had no usual residents at the time of either the 2001 or 2011 censuses." None except Lamb Holm are greater than 40 ha in area.

Freshwater islands

There are numerous other freshwater islands, of which the more notable include Lochindorb Castle Island, Loch Leven Castle Island, St Serf's Inch, and Inchmahome, each of which have played an important part in Scottish history.

Inchmurrin is the largest freshwater island in the British Isles. It is in Loch Lomond, which contains over sixty other islands. Loch Maree also contains several islands, the largest of which are Eilean Sùbhainn, Garbh Eilean and Eilean Ruairidh Mòr but aren't as big as others.

Smaller offshore islands

This is a continuing list of uninhabited Scottish islands smaller than 40 hectares in size.

Small archipelagos

There are various small archipelagos which may be better known than the larger islands they contain. These include:

Former islands

The following is a list of places which were formerly islands, but which are no longer so due to silting up, harbour building etc.

Bodinbo Island near to Erskine on the River Clyde is now partly joined to the river bank.
Broch of Clickimin is a former island in Loch of Clickimin, Lerwick, in Shetland. Originally an offshore island, the loch became cut off from the sea around 200 BC and the island is now connected to dry land by a permanent causeway.
 Bunglan was once a separate island, but is now connected to Samphrey by two tombolos.
 Eilean-a-beithich was once one of the Slate Islands and located in Easdale Sound. This was eventually breached by the sea and little visible sign of the island now remains.
 Eilean Chaluim Chille is a former island near Kilmuir on Skye in a now drained loch that was associated with the 13th century Hebridean lord Páll, son of Bálki.
 Inchbroach, also known as Rossie Island, is now part of Montrose harbour.
 Inch of Culter is a former island in the River Dee near Maryculter.
 Innis Bheag or Paterson Island near Portmahomack in Easter Ross is now permanently attached to the Morrich More due to shifting sands.
 Keith Inch (not to be confused with Inchkeith), is now part of Peterhead Harbour, and is the easternmost point of mainland Scotland.
 King's Inch on which stood Inch Castle.
 Milton Island or Green Inch was an island in the Clyde's estuarine waters close to the old ford across the river at Dumbuck near Dumbarton.
 Newshot Island or Newshot Isle was an island of circa 50 acres or 20 hectares lying in the River Clyde close to Park Quay, Renfrewshire, Scotland. It is now partly joined to the river bank.
 North Inch, one of the "Inches" in Perth, formerly an island in the River Tay.
 Preston Island, an artificial construction south of Low Valleyfield, has now been fully reclaimed, using ash slurry from Longannet power station.
 Rosyth Castle also stands on what was once a tidal island in the Firth of Forth, now surrounded by reclaimed land.
 Sand Inch was a small island in the River Clyde next to King's Inch
 Scalp na Caoraich, Cridhe An Uisge, Rònach and Scalp Phàdraig Mhòir - four small islands at the delta of the River Ness in Inverness which were removed in the 19th century.
 Scottle Holm was an islet north of Lerwick, Shetland. It has since become part of an industrial estate.
 White Inch, now an area of Glasgow.

Bridged islands

Many of Scotland's islands are connected to the mainland and/or other islands by bridge or causeway. Although some people consider them no longer to be islands, they are generally treated as such.

Outer Hebrides

Many of the islands of the southern Outer Hebrides have been joined to other islands by causeways and bridges. These include:
 Baleshare
 Benbecula
 Berneray
 Eriskay
 Grimsay
 North Uist
 South Uist
 Vatersay, which joined to Barra, but not to the above islands.

To the north, Scalpay and Great Bernera are connected to Lewis and Harris.

Inner Hebrides
 Skye is connected to the mainland by the Skye Bridge which now incorporates Eilean Bàn.
 Eilean Donan by causeway to the mainland
 Eriska by causeway to the mainland
 Seil (to mainland) via John Stevenson's 1792 "Bridge over The Atlantic".
 Danna  by causeway to the mainland

Orkney Islands

Similarly, four Orkney islands are joined to the Orkney Mainland by a series of causeways known as the Churchill Barriers. They are:
 South Ronaldsay
 Burray
 Lamb Holm
 Glimps Holm

Hunda is in turn connected to Burray via a causeway.

South Walls and Hoy are connected by a causeway called the Ayre. The islands are treated as one entity (Hoy) by the UK census.

Shetland Islands

Several Shetland islands are joined to the Shetland Mainland:
 West Burra and East Burra (via Trondra)
 Muckle Roe
 Trondra
 Broch of Clickimin is a freshwater islet joined to the mainland by a stone causeway.
 Holm of Mel was a tidal island linked to the west coast of Bressay at low tide but it is now linked permanently to its larger neighbour by a 75m stone causeway.

There is also a bridge from Housay to Bruray.

Others

Various other islands are also connected by bridges or causeways, to the mainland or other islands, including:
 Inchgarvie (part of Forth Bridge), thus joined to both Fife and Lothian on the Mainland.
 Garbh Eilean at the entrance to Loch Glencoul is now joined to the mainland by both the Kylesku Bridge to the south and its associated roadworks to the north.
 Innis Chonan, an inhabited island in Loch Awe is connected to the mainland by a small road bridge.
 Moncreiffe Island connected to the mainland by the Tay Viaduct

Tidal islands and tombolos

There are a large number of small tidal islands in Scotland. The more notable ones include:
 Baleshare
 Bernera
 Calve Island
 Castle Island
 Corn Holm
 Cramond Island
 Island Davaar
 Dunnicaer
 Eilean Mhic Chrion
 Eilean Shona
 Eriska
 Erraid
 Helliar Holm
 Kili Holm
 Isle Ristol
 Sanday
 Torsa

Oronsay means "ebb island" and there are several tidal islands of this name.

The three main islands of the Monach Islands (Heisgeir), Ceann Iar, Ceann Ear and Shivinish are connected at low tides. In the 16th century, a large tidal wave was said to have washed the route away.

St Ninian's Isle is connected to Mainland Shetland by a tombolo. Although greater than 40 hectares in size it fails to meet the definition of an island used in this list as it is only surrounded by water during occasional spring tides and storms.

This is normally impassable but is reputed to dry out on rare occasions.

Complex islands

There are a number of offshore islands that defy easy classification.
 Ceallasaigh Mòr and Ceallasaigh Beag are islands in Loch Maddy, North Uist which are both c.  in extent at high tide. At low tide they are connected to one another and several other small tidal islets in the shallow lagoon that surrounds them.
 Eileanan Chearabhaigh.

Castle islands

There are several small Scottish islands that are dominated by a castle or other fortification. The castle is often better known than the island, and the islands are often tidal or bridged. Due to their picturesque nature some of them are well known from postcards and films. Examples are:

 Bass Rock
 Broch of West Burrafirth
 Castle Island
 Calvay
 Castle Stalker
 Castle Tioram
 Eilean Aigas (F)
 Eilean Dearg, Loch Riddon
 Eilean Donan
 Inchtalla (F)
 Inveruglas Isle (F)
 Kilchurn Castle (F)
 Kisimul Castle
 Lochindorb Castle (F)
 Loch Leven Castle (F)
 Mousa
 Threave Castle (F)
 Wyre

Many of the Islands of the Forth and southern Orkney Islands have fortifications from the two world wars. Rosyth Castle stands on a former island.

Holy islands

A large number of the islands of Scotland have some kind of culdee/church connection, and/or are dominated by a church. The more notable include:

 Island Davaar
 Egilsay
 Eynhallow
 Holy Island
 Inchcolm
 Inch Kenneth
 Inchmahome (F)
 Iona
 Isle Maree
 North Rona
 Oronsay
 Papa Stronsay (current Transalpine Redemptorist monastery. Islands called "Papa" or "Pabbay" tend to be former saints' islands)
 St Ninian's Isle
 St Serf's Inch (F)
 Tiree ("land of Iona")

Brother Isle's name is not ecclesiastical in origin as is sometimes stated.

Islands named after people
This is a list of islands, which are known to be named after someone. In some cases such as North Ronaldsay this status may not be obvious (it isn't named after a "Ronald", unlike South Ronaldsay). This list omits names such as Hildasay, where the person in question is mythological, or Ailsa Craig, where the individual in question is not known, and also Colonsay & Egilsay where the derivation is disputed.

 Eilean Chaluim Chille - Saint Columba
 Island Davaar - Saint Barr
 Eilean Donan  - Saint Donan
 Flannan Isles - Saint Flannan
 Frank Lockwood's Island (south of Lochbuie, Mull)
 Inchcolm  - Saint Columba
 Inch Kenneth  - Saint Kenneth
 Inchmarnock - Saint Mearnag
 Inchmahome (F) - Saint Colmag
 Inchmurrin (F) - Saint Meadhran/Mirin
 Innis Chonan (F) - Saint Conan
 Isle Maree (F) - Maelrubha
 Isle Martin  - Saint Martin
 North Rona - Saint Ronan
 St Serf's Inch (F) - Saint Serf
 Sweyn Holm – Sweyn Asleifsson
 Taransay - Saint Taran

Iqbal Singh, the owner of Vacsay, has also expressed wishes to rename it after Robert Burns.

Places called "island" etc. that are not islands

Some places in Scotland with names including "isle" or "island" are not islands. They include:

Lewis and Harris are separated by a range of hills but form one island, and are sometimes referred to as "Lewis and Harris". Isle of Whithorn and the Black Isle are peninsulas, and Isleornsay is a village which looks out onto the island of Ornsay. There is no commonly accepted derivation for "Burntisland" which had numerous other forms in the past, such as "Brintilun" and "Ye Brint Eland".

Gluss Isle at the western entrance to Sullom Voe is one of the many promontories in Orkney and Shetland connected to a larger body of land by an ayre.

Other elements

The name "Inch" (Innis) can mean island (e.g. Inchkenneth, Inchcolm), but is also used for terra firma surrounded by marsh e.g. Markinch, Insch.

Eilean is Gaelic for "island". However, Inistrynich, Eilean na Maodail, Eilean Dubh and Liever Island are all promontories on Loch Awe as opposed to islands, despite their names. Likewise Eilean Aoidhe on Loch Fyne. The Black Isle is also An t-Eilean Dubh in Gaelic, while Eilean Glas is part of Scalpay.

"-holm" is also common as a suffix in various landlocked placenames, especially in the far south of mainland Scotland e.g. Langholm, Kirk Yetholm, Holmhead (by Cumnock), Holmhill (next to Thornhill, Nithsdale). Some of these were river islands in their time, or dry land surrounded by marsh. "Holm" can be found in an element in Holmsgarth, now a suburb of Lerwick and the Parish of Holm on Mainland Shetland and Mainland Orkney respectively. Neither of these is an island in its own right.

Islands named after mainland areas
Likewise, occasionally an island may be named after a location on the nearby mainland, or a major neighbouring island - or vice versa. Examples of this include: Vementry, which was originally the name of an island, but whose name has been transferred to a nearby farm on Mainland Shetland; Oldany Island, whose name has been transferred to Oldany; Cramond Island which is named after neighbouring Cramond (a district of Edinburgh); and Eilean Mhealasta in the Outer Hebrides, which is named after Mealista on Lewis.

The name Easdale appears to be the combination of  eas, which is Gaelic for "waterfall" and dal, the Norse for "valley". However, it is not clear why either description should apply to this tiny island which is low lying and has no waterfalls and the name may have come from the nearby village of the same name on Seil.

Crannogs
Crannogs are prehistoric artificial islands created in lochs. There are several hundred sites in Scotland. Today, crannogs typically appear as small, circular islands, between 10 and 30 metres (30–100 feet) in diameter. Scottish crannogs include:
 Breachacha on Coll
 Cherry Island in Loch Ness
 Dùn Anlaimh on Coll
 Eilean Dòmhnuill on North Uist
 Keppinch (or The Kitchen) in Loch Lomond

See also

 British Isles
 Geography of Scotland
 List of the British Isles by area
 List of lochs on Scottish islands
 List of Marilyns on Scottish islands
 List of Munros on Skye and Mull
 List of Orkney islands
 List of Outer Hebrides
 List of Shetland islands
 Scottish island names

References and footnotes
Notes

Specific references

General references

 
 
 
 
 
 Murray, W.H. (1973) The Islands of Western Scotland: the Inner and Outer Hebrides. London. Eyre Methuen. 

 
 Nicolson, James R. (1972) Shetland. Newton Abbot. David & Charles.
 Omand, Donald (ed.) (2003) The Orkney Book. Edinburgh. Birlinn. 
Symonds, James  (June 1999) "Toiling in the Vale of Tears: Everyday Life and Resistance in South Uist, Outer Hebrides, 1760—1860". International Journal of Historical Archaeology/JSTOR. 3 No. 2, Archaeologies of Resistance in Britain and Ireland, Part II, pp. 101–122. Retrieved 8 September 2013.

External links

Scottish Island Network - Population Statistics
Scottish Islands Access Rights

Scotland, List of islands of
 
Scotland